A cave salamander is a type of salamander that primarily or exclusively inhabits caves, a group that includes several species. Some of these animals have developed special, even extreme, adaptations to their subterranean environments. Some species have only rudimentary (or even absent) eyes (blind salamanders). Others lack pigmentation, rendering them a pale yellowish or pinkish color (e.g., Eurycea rathbuni). 

With the notable exception of Proteus anguinus, all "cave salamanders" are members of the family Plethodontidae ("lungless salamanders"). Almost all of them are paedomorphic and therefore never goes through a metamorphosis, but it is not clear if this happened before or after they adapted to an existence in caves, as some species that don't live in caves are also paedomorphic.

History
The first dedicated scientific study of a cave animal was focused upon a cave salamander, Proteus anguinus. It was originally identified as a "dragon's larva" by Johann Weikhard von Valvasor in 1689. Later, the Austrian naturalist Joseph Nicolaus Lorenz described it scientifically in 1768.

Another early scientific description of a cave salamander was undertaken by Constantine Samuel Rafinesque in 1822 while he was a professor of botany and natural history at Transylvania University in Lexington, Kentucky. The species he described was known to the locals as a "cave puppet" and is now known to be Eurycea lucifuga. His discovery was not surprising at the time because E. lucifuga inhabits near the entrance of caves, thus an in-depth exploration was not required; and, E. lucifuga is neither blind nor depigmented.

List of cave salamanders

The following species have commonly been termed "the cave salamander" without any additional modifier or adjective:
The olm (Proteus anguinus, or proteus), the first discovered example, a blind salamander endemic to caves of southeastern Europe
The spotted-tail cave salamander (Eurycea lucifuga), a lungless salamander endemic to caves of the eastern United States
Eurycea (of North America) and Speleomantes (of Italy and France) are two genera of lungless salamanders with so many individual species termed "cave salamanders" that the entire group is sometimes so designated.
Individual species of "cave salamander" (in some cases "blind salamander"), usually designated with an additional modifier or adjective in their common name, include the following lungless salamanders:
Eurycea lucifuga, often simply known as the cave salamander, alternately the spotted-tail salamander
Eurycea rathbuni, the Texas cave salamander, or Texas blind salamander (formerly, Typhlomolge rathbuni)
Eurycea tridentifera, the Honey Creek Cave blind salamander, or Comal blind salamander
Eurycea braggi, the southern grotto salamander (formerly Typhlotriton braggi)
Eurycea nerea, the northern grotto salamander (formerly Typhlotriton nereus)
Eurycea spelaea, the western grotto salamander or Ozark blind salamander (formerly, Typhlotriton speleus)
Speleomantes ambrosii, Ambrosi's cave salamander, or French cave salamander, or Spezia cave salamander
Speleomantes imperialis, imperial cave salamander, or scented cave salamander
Speleomantes supramontis, the Supramonte cave salamander
Speleomantes italicus, the Italian cave salamander
Speleomantes flavus, the Monte Albo cave salamander, or Stefani's salamander
Speleomantes strinatii, Strinati's cave salamander
Speleomantes sarrabusensis, Sarrabus' cave salamander
Gyrinophilus palleucus, the Tennessee cave salamander
G. p. necturoides, the Big Mouth Cave salamander
Gyrinophilus gulolineatus, the Berry Cave salamander
Gyrinophilus subterraneus, West Virginia spring salamander
Atylodes genei, the brown cave salamander, or Gene's cave salamander, Sardinian cave salamander, or simply Sardinian salamander
Chiropterotriton mosaueri, the cave splayfoot salamander
Haideotriton wallacei, the Georgia blind salamander (Haideotriton is considered synonymous with Eurycea by some experts.)
Plethodon dixi, the Dixie Caverns salamander

References

See also
List of troglobites

 
Amphibian common names